Tha Sak railway station is a railway station located in Tha Sak Subdistrict, Phichai District, Uttaradit. It is located 461.802 km from Bangkok railway station and is a class 2 railway station. It is on the Northern Line of the State Railway of Thailand.

Train services
 Special Express 3/4 Bangkok-Sawankhalok/Sila At-Bangkok
 Rapid 102 Chiang Mai-Bangkok
 Rapid 105/106 Bangkok-Sila At-Bangkok
 Rapid 107/108 Bangkok-Den Chai-Bangkok
 Rapid 109 Bangkok-Chiang Mai
 Rapid 111/112 Bangkok-Den Chai-Bangkok
 Local 403 Phitsanulok-Sila At
 Local 407/408 Nakhon Sawan-Chiang Mai-Nakhon Sawan
 Local 410 Sila At-Phitsanulok

References 
 Ichirō, Kakizaki (2010). Ōkoku no tetsuro: tai tetsudō no rekishi. Kyōto: Kyōtodaigakugakujutsushuppankai. 
 Otohiro, Watanabe (2013). Tai kokutetsu yonsenkiro no tabi: shasō fūkei kanzen kiroku. Tōkyō: Bungeisha. 

Railway stations in Thailand